The 2001–02 Illinois State Redbirds men's basketball team represented Illinois State University during the 2001–02 NCAA Division I men's basketball season. The Redbirds, led by third year head coach Tom Richardson, played their home games at Redbird Arena and competed as a member of the Missouri Valley Conference.

They finished the season 17–14, 12–6 in conference play to finish in third place. They were the number three seed for the Missouri Valley Conference tournament. They were victorious over Drake University in their quarterfinal game but were defeated by Creighton University in their semifinal game.

Roster

Schedule

|-
!colspan=9 style=|Regular Season

|-
!colspan=9 style=|State FarmMissouri Valley Conference {MVC} tournament

References

Illinois State Redbirds men's basketball seasons
Illinois State
Illinois State Redbirds Men's Basketball
Illinois State Redbirds Men's Basketball